Serdar Koca (born 28 February 1994) is a Turkish badminton player from Bursa. He competed at the 2018 Mediterranean Games, and won the silver medal in the men's doubles event partnered with Serhat Salim.

Achievements

Mediterranean Games 
Men's doubles

BWF International Challenge/Series (3 runners-up) 
Men's doubles

Mixed doubles

  BWF International Challenge tournament
  BWF International Series tournament
  BWF Future Series tournament

References

External links 
 

Living people
1994 births
Sportspeople from Bursa
Turkish male badminton players
Competitors at the 2018 Mediterranean Games
Mediterranean Games silver medalists for Turkey
Mediterranean Games medalists in badminton